The National Science Education Leadership Association (NSELA), founded in 1959 and headquartered in suburban Denver, Colorado, is a U.S.-based international science-education professional society composed of science department heads, supervisors, coordinators, university science and science education faculty, administrators, science resource teachers, teacher advocates, elementary science lead teachers and others. The association holds two conferences annually and publishes The Science Educator, a refereed journal of articles on current science education theory, research, and teaching and learning applications.

NSELA is an affiliate of the National Science Teachers Association (NSTA) and the American Association for the Advancement of Science (AAAS).

History 
NSELA was incorporated in 1959 as the National Science Supervisors Association and had its first official conference in 1960 in Chicago, Illinois.

References

Science education in the United States
Non-profit organizations based in Colorado
Organizations based in Denver